Curetis regula is a species of butterfly belonging to the lycaenid family. It was described by Evans in 1954. It is found in Southeast Asia (Borneo, Java, Sumatra, Peninsular Malaya, Burma and Thailand).

External links
"Curetis Hübner, [1819]" at Markku Savela's Lepidoptera and Some Other Life Forms. Retrieved June 6, 2017.

Butterflies of Asia
Butterflies of Borneo
regula
Butterflies described in 1954
Taxa named by William Harry Evans